A lower house is one of two chambers of a bicameral legislature, the other chamber being the upper house. Despite its official position "below" the upper house, in many legislatures worldwide, the lower house has come to wield more power or otherwise exert significant political influence. The lower house, typically, is the larger of the two chambers, meaning its members are more numerous.

Common attributes 
In comparison with the upper house, lower houses frequently display certain characteristics (though they vary per jurisdiction).

Powers
 In a parliamentary system, the lower house:
In the modern era, has much more power, usually based on restrictions against the upper house.
Is able to override the upper house in some ways.
Can vote a motion of no confidence against the government, as well as vote for or against any proposed candidate for head of government at the beginning of the parliamentary term.  
Exceptions are Australia, where the Senate has considerable power approximate to that of the House of Representatives, and Italy and Romania, where the Senate has exactly the same powers as the Chamber of Deputies.
 In a presidential system, the lower house:
 Debatably somewhat less, the lower house also has exclusive powers in some areas.
 Has the sole power to impeach the executive (the upper house then tries the impeachment).
 Typically initiates appropriation/supply-related legislation.

Status of lower house
 Always elected directly, while the upper house may be elected directly, indirectly, or not elected at all.
 Its members may be elected with a different voting system to the upper house.
 Most populated administrative divisions are better represented than in the upper house; representation is usually proportional to population.  
 Elected more frequently.
 Elected all at once, not by staggered terms.
 In a parliamentary system, can be dissolved by the executive.
 More members.
 Has total or initial control over budget, supply, and monetary laws.
 Lower age of candidacy than the upper house.

The government of the day is usually required to present its budget to the lower house, which must approve the budget. It is a widespread practice for revenue (appropriation) bills to originate in the lower house. A notable exception to this is the West Virginia House of Delegates, which allows revenue bills to originate from either house.

Titles of lower houses 

Many lower houses are named in manners such as these:

 Chamber of Deputies
 Chamber of Representatives
 House of Assembly
 House of Representatives
 House of Commons
 Lok Sabha of India
 House of Delegates
 Legislative Assembly
 National Assembly

See also 
 Representative democracy

References

 
Legislatures